Jay Bhanushali (born 25 December 1984) is an Indian television actor. He is best known for playing Neev Shergill in Ekta Kapoor's show Kayamath and winning Nach Baliye 5. He also participated in Jhalak Dikhhla Jaa 2, Kaun Jeetega Bollywood Ka Ticket, Iss Jungle Se Mujhe Bachao, Fear Factor: Khatron Ke Khiladi 7 and Bigg Boss 15.

Early life 
He was born 25 December 1984 in Ahmedabad, Gujarat, in a middle-class family.

Career

2006–2009 
Bhanushali made his television debut with the show  Kasautii Zindangii Kay by playing the supporting role. In 2007 he again played the supporting role of Varun Bhaskar.Dhoom Machaao Dhoom. He got his biggest break came when he was selected by Ekta Kapoor to play the role of protagonist Neev Shergill in her soap opera Kayamath. The role not only earned him praises but also won him several awards for his performance in the show. Bhanushali went on to win Indian Telly Award for Fresh New Face - Male, Indian Telly Award for Best Actor in a Supporting Role and various other awards for his performance. In 2007 he participated in Jhalak Dikhhla Jaa 2 where he finished as 2nd runner-up. In 2008 he participated in the show Kaun Jeetega Bollywood Ka Ticket where he finished as 6th place. In 2009 he also participated in the show Iss Jungle Se Mujhe Bachao as a wild-card where he got evicted on day 60. In same year he played the role Yuraaj in Kis Desh Mein Hai Meraa Dil. In same year, Bhanushali also hosted Dance India Dance .He won praise from several quarters for anchoring the show Dance India Dance for  his anchoring skills and comic timings.

2010–2013 
In 2010, he hosted Dance India Dance 2 and Meethi Choori No 1 where he was praised for his hosting skills. In same year he participated in the reality show Nachle Ve with Saroj Khan. In 2010 he played the role of Yash Malhotra in the show Geet – Hui Sabse Parayi.  Bhanushali won Boroplus Gold Award for Best Anchor (2010 and 2012), Zee Rishtey Award for Favorite Host (2009, 2010 and 2011) and several other accolades. In 2011 he hosted dance show Dance India Dance Doubles. In 2012 he hosted several shows dance shows like Dance India Dance 3, Dance India Dance Li'l Masters 2, Dance Ke Superkids and Sa Re Ga Ma Pa 2012 and also won the dance reality show Nach Baliye 5 with his wife Mahhi Vij. In 2012 he played the Anuj in Kairi — Rishta Khatta Meetha. In 2013 he hosted the show Dance India Dance 4.

2014–2017 and success 
In 2014 he debut in romantic Thriller Hate Story 2 alongside Surveen Chawla. In 2014 only he played the role of Gyani in Desi Kattey. In the same year, he again hosted two dance shows Dance India Dance Li'l Masters 2 and Dil Se Naachein Indiawaale. In 2015 he played the role of Karan in Ek Paheli Leela alongside Sunny Leone and Rajneesh Duggal. In 2015 only he again hosted Dance India Dance 5. In 2016 he participated in the stunt-based reality show Khatron Ke Khiladi 7 and got eliminated in the 2nd week but re-entered on 5th week and voluntarily exited in 9th week and finished as 9th place. He hosted the dance show The Voice India Kids. In 2017 he hosted the show Sabse Bada Kalakar.

2018–2021 
In 2018, he hosted the famous dance shows Super Dancer and Indian Idol 10. In 2019, he appeared as an episodic contestant in Kitchen Champion 5. He later hosted the dance reality show Superstar Singer. In 2020 he participated in Khatron Ke Khiladi - Made in India and finished as 6th place. In 2021, he participated in reality series Bigg Boss 15 and got evicted on day 55. Since April 2023, Bhanushali has been starring as Shiv in Hum Rahe Na Rahe Hum opposite Tina Datta.

Filmography

Films

Web series

Television

As actor / participant

As presenter

Special appearances

Personal life 

Jay  married  actress Mahhi Vij on 11 November 2011. In 2017 they fostered a boy, Rajveer, and a girl, Khushi. The couple's first biological child, a daughter named Tara, was born in 2019.

See also 
List of Indian television actors

References

External links

Indian male television actors
Living people
Male actors from Ahmedabad
Dance India Dance
Gujarati people
Indian television presenters
Nach Baliye winners
1984 births
21st-century Indian male actors
Indian male film actors
Fear Factor: Khatron Ke Khiladi participants
Bigg Boss (Hindi TV series) contestants